The Eastern Cape is one of the provinces of South Africa. Its capital is Bhisho, but its two largest cities are East London and Gqeberha.

The second largest province in the country (at 168,966 km2) after Northern Cape, it was formed in 1994 out of the Xhosa homelands or bantustans of Transkei and Ciskei, together with the eastern portion of the Cape Province. The central and eastern part of the province is the traditional home of the indigenous Xhosa people. In 1820 this area which was known as the Xhosa Kingdom began to be settled by Europeans who originally came from England and some from Scotland and Ireland.

Since South Africa's early years, many Xhosas believed in Africanism and figures such as Walter Rubusana believed that the rights of Xhosa people and Africans in general, could not be protected unless Africans mobilized and worked together. As a result, the Eastern Cape is home to many anti-apartheid leaders such as Robert Sobukwe, Oliver Tambo, Nelson Mandela, Walter Sisulu, Winnie Mandela, Govan Mbeki, Alfred Xuma, Cecilia Makiwane, Noni Jabavu among others. It is also home the then young Thabo Mbeki, Chris Hani, Bantu Holomisa, Steve Biko, musicians Miriam Makeba, Madosini, Nathi, Vusi Nova and Zahara as well as historical figures such as Rev. Tiyo Soga, Samuel Mqhayi, Mongezi Sifika wa Nkomo, Enoch Sontonga and Jotello Festiri Soga.

History
The Eastern Cape as a South African Province came into existence in 1994 and incorporated areas from the former Xhosa homelands of the Transkei and Ciskei, together with what was previously part of the Cape Province. This resulted in several anomalies including the fact that the Province has four supreme courts (in Grahamstown (Makhanda), Port Elizabeth (Gqeberha), Bhisho and Mthatha) and had enclaves of KwaZulu-Natal in the province. The latter anomaly has fallen away with amendments to municipal and provincial boundaries.

The Xhosa Kingdom was one of the most powerful kingdoms in Africa and had all states in the Eastern Cape as tributaries. Any group, people or tribe that recognized the Xhosa Kingdom as Paramouncy became Xhosa, practiced Xhosa culture and used isiXhosa as their main language. Some of the tribes that fall under the category of Xhosa people include: AmaMpondo, AbaThembu, AmaMpondomise, AmaHlubi, AmaBhaca, AmaXesibe, AmaBomvana and more.

European settlers

In the late 18th century the Dutch Cape Colony slowly expanded eastwards from its original centre around Cape Town. This led to the establishment in 1786 of the Dutch settlement of Graaff-Reinet – named for the Governor of the Cape Colony Cornelius Jacob van de Graaff (in office: 1785–1791) and for his wife Hester Cornelia van de Graaff (née Reynet). Later, during the Napoleonic wars of 1803–1815, Britain took control of the Cape Colony (1806) and encouraged British citizens to migrate there as a means to boost the British population in the area. 

From the early 1800s until the formation of the Union of South Africa in 1910, the Eastern Cape saw colonisation by British migrants. English settlers established most of the towns, naming them either for places in England or for the original founders. British colonisation saw schools, churches, hospitals, town centres and government buildings built to speed up development. Some of the older European settlements include: Grahamstown (1812), Port Elizabeth (1820),  Salem (1820),  Bathurst (1820), East London (1836),  Paterson (1879),  Cradock (1814) and King William's Town.

Demographics 
The population of Eastern Cape Province is 6,562,053, of whom 86.3% are Black, 8.3% are Coloureds, 4.7% are White and 0.4% are Indian/Asian. A large majority of people in the province are Xhosa, with 78.8% of residents in Eastern Cape identifying as Xhosa as of 2011. Unlike most of South Africa the White population is overwhelmingly of British descent.  Roughly 90% of White South Africans in Eastern Cape are English-speakers of British descent while only about 10% of Whites in the province are of Boer/Afrikaner ancestry. Eastern Cape is one of only two provinces in South Africa where British descended Whites outnumber Boers/Afrikaners, the other being Kwazulu-Natal. Port Elizabeth is the largest city in Eastern Cape Province.

Notable people

Law and government

The first premier was Raymond Mhlaba and the current premier is Oscar Mabuyane, both of the African National Congress. The province is served by the capital of Bhisho next to King William's Town. The parliament and other important government buildings are situated in the precinct. The High Court that is superior to all courts in the region is situated in Grahamstown and has local seats in Port Elizabeth, East London, and Bhisho.

Geography 

The Eastern Cape gets progressively wetter from west to east. The west is mostly semiarid Karoo, except in the far south, which is temperate rainforest in the Tsitsikamma region. The coast is generally rugged with interspersed beaches. Most of the province is hilly to very mountainous between Graaff-Reinet and Rhodes including the Sneeuberge (English: Snow Mountains), Stormberge, Winterberge and Drakensberg (English: Dragon Mountains). The highest point in the province is Ben Macdhui at 3001 m. The east from East London and Queenstown towards the KwaZulu-Natal border – a region known previously as Transkei – is lush grassland on rolling hills, punctuated by deep gorges with intermittent forest.

Eastern Cape has a coast on its east which lines southward, creating shores leading to the south Indian Ocean. In the northeast, it borders the following districts of Lesotho:
Mohale's Hoek District – west of Quthing
Quthing District – between Mohale and Qacha's Nek
Qacha's Nek District – east of Quthing

Domestically, it borders the following provinces:
Western Cape – west
Northern Cape – northwest
Free State – north
KwaZulu-Natal – far northeast

Climate 
Climate is highly varied. The west is dry with sparse rain during winter or summer, with frosty winters and hot summers. The area Tsitsikamma to Grahamstown receives more precipitation, which is also relatively evenly distributed and temperatures are mild. Further east, rainfall becomes more plentiful and humidity increases, becoming more subtropical along the coast with summer rainfall. The interior can become very cold in winter, with heavy snowfalls occasionally occurring in the mountainous regions between Molteno and Rhodes.
Gqeberha: Jan Max: 25 °C, Min: 18 °C; Jul Max: 20 °C, Min: 9 °C
Molteno & Barkly East: Jan Max 28 °C, Min 11 °C; Jul Max: 14 °C, Min: -7 °C

Tourism 

The landscape is extremely diverse. The western interior is largely arid Karoo, while the east is well-watered and green. The Eastern Cape offers a wide array of attractions, including  of untouched and pristine coastline along with beaches, and big-five game viewing in a malaria-free environment.

Its  offers sanctuary to 170 elephants, 400 Cape buffalo and 21 black rhino of the very scarce Kenyan sub-species.

The province is the location of Tiffindell, South Africa's only snow skiing resort, which is situated near the hamlet of Rhodes in the Southern Drakensberg. It is on the slopes of Ben Macdhui, the highest mountain peak in the Eastern Cape .

The National Arts Festival, held annually in Grahamstown, is Africa's largest cultural event, offering a choice of both indigenous and imported talent. Every year for eleven days the town's population almost doubles, as over 50,000 people flock to the region for a feast of arts, crafts, music and entertainment.

Jeffreys Bay is an area with wild coastline, which is backed by sub-tropical rainforest. The waters here are noted for having good waves for surfing.

Aliwal North, lying on an agricultural plateau on the southern bank of the Orange River, is an inland resort known for its hot springs.

The rugged and unspoiled Wild Coast is a place of spectacular scenery. The coastal areas have been a graveyard for many vessels.

Whittlesea, Eastern Cape, situated in the Amatola Mountains, is known for the first wine estate in the province.

King William's Town, Alice, Queenstown, Grahamstown, Cradock and Fort Beaufort offer some of the best colonial architecture of the 19th century in the province. The two major cities lining the coast are East London and Port Elizabeth.

Economy 
The Eastern Cape is the poorest province in South Africa and has the highest expanded and official unemployment rate in the country. Subsistence agriculture predominates in the former homelands, resulting in widespread poverty. A multi billion Rand industrial development zone and deep water port are being developed in Coega to boost investment in export-oriented industries. Overall the province only contributes 8% to the national GDP despite making 13.5% of the population. The real GDP of Eastern Cape stands at an estimated R230.3billion in 2017, making the province the fourth largest regional economy in SA ahead of Limpopo and Mpumalanga.

Agriculture
There is much fertile land in the Eastern Cape, and agriculture remains important. The fertile Langkloof Valley in the southwest has large deciduous fruit orchards. In the Karoo there is widespread sheep farming.

The Alexandria-Makhanda area produces pineapples, chicory and dairy products, while coffee and tea are cultivated at Magwa. People in the former Transkei region are dependent on cattle, maize and sorghum-farming. An olive nursery has been developed in collaboration with the University of Fort Hare to form a nucleus of olive production in the Eastern Cape.

Domestic stock farming is slowly giving way to game farming on large scale. Eco-tourism is resulting in economic benefits, and there is lower risk needed to protect wild, native game against drought, and the natural elements. Habitat loss and poaching pose the greatest problems.

The area around Stutterheim is being cultivated extensively with timber plantations.

The basis of the province's fishing industry is squid, some recreational and commercial fishing for line fish, the collection of marine resources, and access to line-catches of hake.

Industry
With three import/export harbours and three airports offering direct flights to the main centres, and an excellent road and rail infrastructure, the province has been earmarked as a key area for growth and economic development in modern South Africa.

The two major industrial centres, Port Elizabeth and East London have well-developed economies based on the automotive industry. General Motors and Volkswagen both have major assembly lines in the Port Elizabeth area, while East London is dominated by the large DaimlerChrysler plant, now known as Mercedes-Benz South Africa.

Environmental-friendly projects include the Fish River Spatial Development Initiative, the Wild Coast SDI, and two industrial development zones, the East London Industrial Development Zone and the Coega IDZ near Port Elizabeth. Coega is the largest infrastructure development in post-apartheid South Africa. The construction of the deepwater Port of Ngqura was completed and the first commercial ship anchored in October 2009.

Other sectors include finance, real estate, business services, wholesale and retail trade, eco-tourism (nature reserves and game ranches) and hotels and restaurants.

Towns and cities
 In the case of places that have been renamed, the traditional name is listed first followed by the new official name.
East London
Port Elizabeth (Gqeberha)
Umtata (Mthatha)
Queenstown (Komani)
Grahamstown (Makhanda)
Jeffreys Bay
Alice (Dikeni)
Graaff-Reinet
Somerset East
Mount Fletcher (Tlokoeng)
Butterworth (Gcuwa)
Mount Frere (KwaBhaca)
Mdantsane
Cradock
Matatiele
King William's Town (Qonce)
Aliwal North (Maletswai)
Uitenhage (Kariega)
Fort Beaufort
Idutywa (Dutywa)
Engcobo (Ngcobo)

Municipalities 

The Eastern Cape Province is divided into two metropolitan municipalities and six district municipalities. The district municipalities are in turn divided into 27 local municipalities.

Education 

The Eastern Cape Department of Education has been roundly criticised for poor primary and secondary education resulting from dysfunction, special interests, and issues with the South Africa teachers union, SADTU. The province struggles with a lack of schools; a lack of teachers leading to overcrowding; a lack of textbooks; a lack of basic facilities like toilets, electricity or water; and poor transport infrastructure which regularly absents and endangers learners. This is a huge problem faced in the former Transkei.

By 2011, basic education had so deteriorated that the national Department of Basic Education intervened under section 100(1)(b) of the Constitution of South Africa, taking control of the province's educational administration. The Eastern Cape has since been the worst-performing province educationally and especially in terms of matriculation; matriculants' results averaged 51% in 2009, 58.3% in 2011, 64.9% in 2013, 65.4% in 2014, and 56.8% in 2015.

In the 2015/2016 financial year, the province failed to spend R 530 million of its allocated R 1.5 billion budget for education, most of it intended for infrastructure development.

Equal Education's 2017 report, Planning to Fail, found a "systemic failure in Eastern Cape education".

Universities 
Rhodes University (Grahamstown)
Nelson Mandela University (Port Elizabeth)
University of Fort Hare (main campus in Alice, satellite campuses in Bhisho and East London)
Walter Sisulu University (campuses in Buffalo City, Butterworth, Mthatha and Queenstown)
Pearson Institute of Higher Education (campuses in East London and Port Elizabeth)

Other educational institutions 
Lovedale College 1in Alice,1 in King William's Town
Buffalo City College, East London 
Queenstown College, Queenstown
Port Elizabeth College, Port Elizabeth
Ikhala College, Queenstown
College of the Transfiguration, Grahamstown
Eastcape Midlands TVET College (6 campuses in Uitenhage, 1 in Grahamstown, 1 in Graaff-Reinet, and 1 in Port Elizabeth)
Various independent FET Colleges (Further Education and Training)

Health 
The province is served by big medical centres such as, Cecilia Makhiwane Hospital that has undergone a major revamp recently.  Filled with state of the art machinery and more beds. There are many private clinics in most cities and also famous hospitals like Frere in East London and Dora Nginza in Port Elizabeth. Tuberculosis and HIV are the province's leading causes of avoidable deaths, accounting for 9.8% and 5.4% of those deaths. Also known for its traditional black initiation schools, which perform coming-of-age ceremonies involving circumcision. These have helped to decrease the rate of people contracting HIV and other sexually transmitted infections.

Sports 
Boxing
Premier Boxing League
 Checkers/Draughts
Mind Sports South Africa
 eSports
Mind Sports South Africa
Football
Swallows FC (Alice, McFarlane)
Blackburn Rovers (East London) (dissolved) 
Chippa United F.C. (Port Elizabeth)
Cricket
Chevrolet Warriors (Port Elizabeth)
Rugby
Eastern Province Elephants (Port Elizabeth)
Border Bulldogs (East London)
Dale High (King William's Town)
Davidson High (Alice)
Hudson Park Boys (East London)
 CUESPORT
 Eastern Cape Pool Billiards (8 Ball Pool) – (Port Elizabeth, Uitenhage, Despatch, Jeffreys Bay, Humansdorp, St. Francis, East London)
 Eastern Cape Blackball Pool (Port Elizabeth, Queenstown)
 Eastern Cape Billiards and Snooker (Port Elizabeth, East London)

References

External links

Eastern Cape National Government information
Eastern Cape Provincial Government
Eastern Cape Socio-Economic Consultative Council
Eastern Cape Development Corporation
www.queenstown.org.za

 
Provinces of South Africa
States and territories established in 1994
1994 establishments in South Africa